The Church of St. Jude, located at 3815 Tenth Avenue at the corner of West 205th Street in the Inwood neighborhood of Manhattan, New York City, is a Catholic parish church in the Archdiocese of New York. Established in 1949, the current sanctuary was built in 1975-76 and was designed by Clark & Warren in the Brutalist style. The School of St. Jude, located around the corner at 431 West 204th Street and built in 1949–51 to designs by Voorhees, Walker, Foley & Smith, was originally the sanctuary as well. A two-story rectory at 411-445 West 204th Street was built in 1957 to designs by architect P. Goodman.

References 
Notes

External links

20th-century Roman Catholic church buildings in the United States
Roman Catholic churches completed in 1951
Roman Catholic churches completed in 1954
Roman Catholic churches completed in 1957
Roman Catholic churches completed in 1975
Christian organizations established in 1949
Roman Catholic churches in Manhattan
Brutalist architecture in New York City
Inwood, Manhattan
1949 establishments in New York City